The term Eastside or East Side has two different meanings in the city of Long Beach, California. The first, and more current meaning, refers to an area roughly comprising the eastern half of the city, usually excluding areas south of the east-west line made by Pacific Coast Highway/Atherton Street. This area is also called East Long Beach.

East Long Beach
East Long Beach is a large area of Long Beach, roughly comprising the eastern geographic half of the city, but usually excluding areas south of the east-west line made by Pacific Coast Highway/Atherton Street. East Long Beach is generally taken to extend north to the northern city boundary and east to the eastern city boundary. Areas east of the 605 Freeway and the San Gabriel River such as El Dorado Park near Orange County form the easternmost boundary. The western boundary is less well-defined, given variously as Lakewood Boulevard, and the Long Beach Municipal Airport to form part of the western boundary.

The neighborhood consists of all or portions of the 90815, 90808, 90804, and 90803 ZIP codes and is adjacent to the Traffic Circle, the California State University, Long Beach campus, the Los Angeles County cities of Lakewood and Hawaiian Gardens, and the Orange County cities of Cypress and Los Alamitos.

See also
Neighborhoods of Long Beach, California

References

Neighborhoods in Long Beach, California
Geography of Long Beach, California